Buironfosse is a commune in the department of Aisne in Hauts-de-France in northern France.

Population

Standoff of 1339
In 1339 the French and English armies, engaged in the Hundred Years War, formed battle lines near Buironfosse, and then did not fight.

See also
Communes of the Aisne department

References

Communes of Aisne
Aisne communes articles needing translation from French Wikipedia